Dos años y un día is a Spanish prison comedy television series created and written by Raúl Navarro, Miguel Esteban, Sergio Sarriá and Luimi Pérez that began airing on 3 July 2022 on Atresplayer Premium. It stars Arturo Valls alongside Adriana Torrebejano, Amaia Salamanca, Fernando Gil, Michael John Treanor and Javier Botet.

Plot 
Carlos Ferrer is a popular television host and comedian sentenced to two years and one day in prison for an offence against religious sensibilities.

Cast 

The series also features cameos by Los Javis (Javier Calvo & Javier Ambrossi) and Mónica Carrillo.

Production 
It consists of 6 episodes featuring an average running time of 30 minutes. Raúl Navarro and Ernesto Sevilla took over direction duties.

Release 
The series premiered on 3 July 2022 on Atresplayer Premium.

References 

Atresplayer Premium original programming
2020s Spanish comedy television series
Spanish-language television shows
2022 Spanish television series debuts
Television shows set in Spain
Spanish prison television series
2020s prison television series
Television series by LACOproductora
Television series by Globomedia